Derrick White may refer to:

Derrick White (baseball) (born 1969), American baseball player
Derrick White (basketball) (born 1994), American basketball player
Derrick White (politician) (1942–2007), writer and political activist from Dublin

See also
Derek White (disambiguation)